Love Eternal is a novel by H. Rider Haggard, first published in 1918.

References

External links
Complete novel at Project Gutenberg

Novels by H. Rider Haggard
1918 British novels